Washington High School may refer to:

Washington High School (Arizona), in Phoenix, Arizona
Washington High School (Fremont, California)
Washington Union High School, in Fresno, California
Washington Preparatory High School, in Los Angeles, California
Washington High School (Georgia), in Atlanta, Georgia
Washington High School (East Chicago, Indiana)
Washington High School (South Bend, Indiana)
Washington High School (Washington, Indiana)
Washington High School (Cedar Rapids, Iowa)
Washington High School (Cherokee, Iowa)
Washington High School (Washington, Iowa)
Washington High School (Kansas), in Kansas City, Kansas
Washington High School (Maryland), in Princess Anne, Maryland
Washington High School (Missouri), in Washington, Missouri
Washington High School (North Carolina), in Washington, North Carolina
Washington Graded and High School, a historic African-American school, now an elementary magnet school in Raleigh, North Carolina
Washington High School (Washington Court House, Ohio), in Washington Court House, Ohio
Washington High School (Oklahoma), in Washington, Oklahoma
Washington High School (Oregon), in Portland, Oregon
Washington School District (Pennsylvania)
Washington High School (Sioux Falls, South Dakota)
Washington High School (Utah), in Ogden, Utah
Washington High School (Washington), in Parkland, Washington
Washington High School (West Virginia), in Charles Town, West Virginia
Washington High School (Milwaukee, Wisconsin)
Washington High School (Two Rivers, Wisconsin)

See also
George Washington High School (disambiguation)
Booker T. Washington High School (disambiguation)
Washington County High School (disambiguation)
Lake Washington High School in Kirkland, Washington